is a Japanese former baseball pitcher. He had previously pitched in Major League Baseball for the Cleveland Indians. He is currently the Pitching Coach for the Hokkaido Nippon-Ham Fighters farm team in Nippon Professional Baseball's Eastern League.

Biography

Tadano was the ace pitcher for Yachiyo Shoin High School, and led the school to the summer Koshien tournament for the first time. He was a highly regarded pitcher coming out of Rikkyo University and was expected to be a high draft pick in the Nippon Professional Baseball draft in 2002. However, no Japanese team drafted him due to a gay porn video scandal; he ultimately left Japan.

He made 14 appearances and four starts with a 4.65 ERA in 50⅓ innings. In January 2004, it was widely reported in America that Tadano was featured in a gay porn video , three years previously, with Tadano appearing at a press conference organized by the team. Tadano said, "I was young, playing baseball, and going to college and my teammates and I needed money."

He was sidelined due to an injury early in the  season, but recovered and was shuttled between Cleveland and the Buffalo Bisons for the rest of the year.

On April 4, 2006, Tadano was traded to the Oakland Athletics for outfielder Ramon Alvarado.

In 2007, Tadano was sent down to Oakland's Double-A team, Midland, after being invited to spring training. He was eventually promoted back up to Triple-A and started off well, looking sharp with a plus splitter. Curiously, he ran into trouble in June. His ERA ballooned as he gave up 29 runs over 5 games. He was moved to the bullpen in July after Oakland demoted Colby Lewis and Shane Komine.

In 2007, he was the 1st pick by the Nippon Ham Fighters in the university/company player draft. He would become the last player of the Matsuzaka Generation to start his NPB career. He missed the start of the 2008 season with an injury.

In 2012, he played in his first Nippon Series against the Yomiuri Giants. However, he was thrown out of the game because he was judged to have thrown a bean ball at Ken Katoh, the Giants' catcher. He is the first pitcher to be thrown out of the game for a dangerous pitch in Nippon Series, though his pitch did not hit Katoh.

References

External links

1980 births
Akron Aeros players
Buffalo Bisons (minor league) players
Cleveland Indians players
Hokkaido Nippon-Ham Fighters players
Japanese expatriate baseball players in the United States
Ishikawa Million Stars players
Kinston Indians players
Living people
Major League Baseball pitchers
Major League Baseball players from Japan
Nippon Professional Baseball coaches
Nippon Professional Baseball pitchers
Sacramento River Cats players
Baseball people from Tokyo
Stockton Ports players
Rikkyo University alumni